Dan Caulkins is a Republican member of the Illinois House of Representatives for the 101st district. The district, located in east central Illinois, includes all or parts of Champaign, DeWitt, Macon, McLean, and Piatt counties. In the 2018 Republican primary, Caulkins defeated Todd Henricks, the Cerro Gordo C.U.S.D. #100 Board of Education President, and Randy Keith, the Piatt County Board Chairman. He defeated Democratic candidate Jen McMillan in the 2018 general election. Caulkins served on the city council in Decatur, Illinois from 2005 until 2009 and as a member of the Eastern Illinois University Board of Trustees from 2015 until 2018. Caulkins owned a number of assisted living facilities until retiring in 2015.

As of July 3rd, 2022, Representative Caulkins was a member of the following Illinois House committees:

 Cybersecurity, Data Analytics, & IT Committee (HCDA)
 Energy & Environment Committee (HENG)
 Prescription Drug Affordability Committee (HPDA)
 Public Utilities Committee (HPUB)

Caulkins is opposed to legislation based on the American Library Association’s Library Bill of Rights  that would prevent libraries from banning books.

Electoral history

References

External links
 Dan Caulkins for Illinois State Representative, official campaign website

Eastern Illinois University alumni
21st-century American politicians
Illinois Republicans
People from Decatur, Illinois
Year of birth missing (living people)
Living people